Jacquelyn Reingold is an American playwright, screenwriter, and producer. She has written multiple plays and worked for television. Her television career started with writing for HBO.

Career
Reingold was a dramatic writing teacher at Ohio University, New York University, and Columbia University. She is a part of the Ensemble Studio Theatre, including its Playwrights Unit. She is an alumnus of New Dramatists and co-founded the Honor Roll! group which advocates for women playwrights who are over 40 years old. On September 26, 1995, Reingold and poet Veronica Patterson held a reading in Clearmont, Wyoming, at the YMCA Youth Center.

She wrote the play String Fever, based around string theory, in 2003 for the Public Understanding of Science and Technology program from the Alfred P. Sloan Foundation. Reingold said that she knew nothing about string theory before writing the play. On March 31, 2004, her play 2B or Not 2B played as a public radio broadcast for Playing on Air. Three of her other plays have also been broadcast for the company. Her play They Float Up was performed in Dublin and off-Broadway in 2019.

Reingold began writing for television for In Treatment on HBO and Law & Order: Criminal Intent on NBC. She is the executive producer for The Good Fight. She was a co-producer for Grace and Frankie on Netflix and Smash on NBC.

Personal life
Reingold earned an MFA in playwriting from Ohio University.

Reception
Scott Collins of the Los Angeles Times wrote that the play Dear Kenneth Blake, about an immigrant from Cambodia, has characters that "verge perilously close to stereotypes", but that it is a "touching production".

In 1993, her play Girl Gone won $15,000 from the Greenwall Foundation's Oscar M. Reubhausen Commission. Girl Gone also won the 1994 Kennedy Center Fund for New American Plays Roger Stevens Award, became a finalist to receive the 1995 Susan Smith Blackburn Prize, and was an honorable mention to receive the Jane Chambers Award. She also received a playwriting grant from New York Foundation for the Arts, two commissions from the Sloan Foundation, was a finalist for the Todd McNerney Prize, and received two Retreat Fellowships.

Her plays have appeared in Women Playwrights: The Best of 1994 and Best American Short Plays 1994–95.

References

Living people
American women screenwriters
American women dramatists and playwrights
American women television producers
American television producers
21st-century American dramatists and playwrights
American screenwriters
New York University faculty
Columbia University faculty
21st-century American women
1959 births